

Belgium
Belgian Congo – Auguste Tilkens, Governor-General of the Belgian Congo (1927–1934)

France
 French Somaliland – Pierre Aimable Chapon-Baissac, Governor of French Somaliland (1924–1932)
 Guinea –
 Antoine Paladi, Lieutenant-Governor of Guinea (1927–1928)
 Jean-Claude Tissier, acting Lieutenant-Governor of Guinea (1928)
 Jean Louis Georges Poiret, Lieutenant-Governor of Guinea (1928–1929)

Japan
 Karafuto – Kōji Kita, Governor-General of Karafuto (27 July 1927 – 9 July 1929)
 Korea – Yamanashi Hanzō, Governor-General of Korea (1927–1929)
 Taiwan –
Mitsunoshin Kamiyama, Governor-General of Taiwan (16 July 1926 – June 1928)
Takeji Kawamura, Governor-General of Taiwan (16 June 1928 – July 1929)

Portugal
 Angola –
 António Vicente Ferreira, High Commissioner of Angola (1926–1928)
 António Damas Mora, High Commissioner of Angola (1928–1929)

United Kingdom
 Malta Colony – John Philip Du Cane, Governor of Malta (1927–1931)
 Northern Rhodesia – Sir James Crawford Maxwell, Governor of Northern Rhodesia (1927–1932)

Notes

Colonial governors
Colonial governors
1928